William McAdam (born 3 October 1944) is a South African cricketer. He played in nineteen first-class and two List A matches between 1966/67 and 1971/72.

See also
 List of Eastern Province representative cricketers

References

External links
 

1944 births
Living people
South African cricketers
Eastern Province cricketers
Western Province cricketers
People from Springs, Gauteng